The 2003 Rally New Zealand (formally the 34th Propecia Rally New Zealand) was the fourth round of the 2003 World Rally Championship. The race was held over four days between 10 April and 13 April 2003, and was based in Auckland, New Zealand. Peugeot's Marcus Grönholm won the race, his 14th win in the World Rally Championship.

Background

Entry list

Itinerary
All dates and times are NZST (UTC+12).

Results

Overall

World Rally Cars

Classification

Special stages

Championship standings

Production World Rally Championship

Classification

Special stages

Championship standings

References

External links 
 Official website of the World Rally Championship

New Zealand
Rally New Zealand
Rally